Mikhail Ivanovich Shuydin (27 September 1922 — 24 August 1983) was a Soviet clown and acrobat-eccentric. People's Artist of the RSFSR. From 1950 he worked in the arena with Yury Nikulin, Member of the Great Patriotic War.

Biography 
Shuydin was born on September 27, 1922 in the village of Kazachya in the Shchyokinsky District of Tula Oblast to a shepherd's family. He lost his parents early on in his life and then moved to Podolsk near Moscow.

Around the start of World War II, he began working at Podolsk's 187th plant as a locksmith.  In May 1942 Shuydin was drafted into the Red Army becoming a student at the Cadet 1st Gorky Tank School. After graduating from college with honors he was sent to the 35th Guards Tank Brigade as a lieutenant.

From 1945-1948 he studied at GUTSI (State School of Circus Arts). In 1950 he graduated from the studio of conversational genres at the Moscow Circus on Tsvetnoy Boulevard. He then began working with Yuri Nikulin as an apprentice-assistant clowns to Karandash.

Soon after leaving Karandash, Nikulin and Shuydin created the clown duo "Nikulin and Shuydin" which lasted until Shuydin suffered a severe illness in 1983. Shuydin's clown image was that of a daring guy who knows everything, in contrast to the image of Nikulin, who was lazy and melancholic. Thus, their joint work was based on conflicting characters.

Shuydin died on August 24, 1983 after a severe and prolonged illness and was buried in Moscow at Kuntsevo Cemetery.

Awards and titles
Order of the Red Star  (1943)
 Order of the Red Banner (1944)
 Jubilee Medal   In Commemoration of the 100th Anniversary of the Birth of Vladimir Ilyich Lenin
 Medal  For the Defence of Moscow
 Medal  For the Defence of Stalingrad
 Medal  For the Victory over Germany in the Great Patriotic War 1941–1945
 Jubilee Medal  Twenty Years of Victory in the Great Patriotic War 1941–1945
Jubilee Medal  Thirty Years of Victory in the Great Patriotic War 1941–1945
  Medal  Veteran of Labour 
  Jubilee Medal  50 Years of the Armed Forces of the USSR 
  Jubilee Medal  60 Years of the Armed Forces of the USSR 
  Medal  In Commemoration of the 800th Anniversary of Moscow 
Honored Artist of the RSFSR (1969)
 People's Artist of the RSFSR (1980)

Memory 
In November 2011, in front of the circus in Kursk, a monument to Yuri Nikulin and Mikhail Shuydin was erected.

References

External links 
 
 Никулин и Шуйдин // ruscircus.ru

1922 births
1983 deaths
Recipients of the Order of the Red Banner
Honored Artists of the RSFSR
People's Artists of the RSFSR
Soviet male film actors
Soviet clowns
Soviet military personnel of World War II
Communist Party of the Soviet Union members
Burials at Kuntsevo Cemetery
People nominated for the title Hero of the Soviet Union